One Night Husband ( or Kuen rai ngao) is a 2003 Thai thriller film directed by Pimpaka Towira and co-written by Pimpaka and Prabda Yoon. It was the debut feature film for Pimpaka, an independent film director and one of the few female directors working in the Thai film industry. One Night Husband was also the film debut of Thai-Canadian pop singer Nicole Theriault.

Plot
On her first night with her husband, newlywed Sipang's husband Napat takes a mysterious phone call and then leaves. When he doesn't return, Sipang asks her new brother-in-law, Chatchai, to help. Joining Sipang in her search is Chatchai's timid wife Busaba. As the search for Napat drags on, Sipang uncovers some disturbing things about her husband's past.

Cast
Nicole Theriault as Sipang
Siriyakorn Pukkavesh as Bussaba
Pongpat Wachirabunjong as Chatchai
Woravit Kaewphet as Napat
Piathip Khumwong as Bussaba's Mother
Kowit Wattanakul as Hieng

Reception
One Night Husband premiered at the Berlin Film Festival in 2003 and was screened at several other film festivals in 2003, including the Deauville Asian Film Festival, Hong Kong International Film Festival, Singapore International Film Festival, CINEFAN Film Festival, Fukuoka Asian Film Festival, Pusan International Film Festival and the Stockholm International Film Festival.

External links

2003 films
Thai thriller films
Thai-language films
2003 romantic drama films
2000s thriller films